Mexican native trout (in Spanish "Truchas Mexicanas")—Mexican rainbow trout, sometimes Baja rainbow trout (Oncorhynchus mykiss nelsoni) and Mexican golden trout (Oncorhynchus chrysogaster) occur in the Pacific Ocean tributaries of the Baja California peninsula and in the Sierra Madre Occidental of northwestern Mexico as far south as Victoria de Durango in the state of Durango.  Many forms of the Mexican rainbow trout (Oncorhynchus mykiss nelsoni and O. m. ssp.), subspecies of the rainbow trout, have been described.  The Mexican golden trout (Oncorhynchus chrysogaster) is a recognized species.

Taxonomy
Most of the Mexican native trout are considered subspecies of the rainbow trout (O. mykiss) and generally lumped as O. m. nelsoni Evermann (1908) or O. m. ssp. The exception is the Mexican golden trout (O. chrysogaster Needham and Gard (1964)) which achieved species status in 1964.  The first records of trout in northwestern Mexico were published by paleontologist E. D. Cope in 1886 where he describes two specimens from Chihuahua as having the appearance of Salmo purpuratus a name sometimes incorrectly used for cutthroat trout (Oncorhynchus clarki). In 1898 and 1905, naturalist E. W. Nelson with the U.S. Biological Survey led explorations into the Mexican mainland (1898) and Baja California peninsula (1905) to document flora and fauna. In 1908, preserved specimens of trout that Nelson brought back from the Rio Santo Domingo (Santo Domingo creek) in the Sierra de San Pedro Mártir mountains of Baja California were described by ichthyologist B.W. Evermann as a new species Salmo nelsoni, the Baja rainbow trout.

In 1936, Paul Needham, a fisheries biologist with the U.S. Bureau of Fisheries began a series of explorations (1936, 1937 and 1938) into the Rio Santo Domingo drainage in Baja California seeking to bring back live specimens of the Baja rainbow trout as hatchery stock and further study. Although live specimens reached U.S. hatcheries, none ever survived to spawn. In 1952, 1955 and 1956 Needham again explored the Sierra Madre Occidental tributaries of the Gulf of California. Needham's explorations led to the publication of Rainbow Trout of Mexico and California (1959) with coauthor Richard Gard. It contains the first full color drawing of the Mexican golden trout. In 1964, Needham and Gard's proposed binomial name Salmo chrysogaster was accepted as the scientific name for a new species of trout, the Mexican golden trout. The specific name chrysogaster is derived from the Greek for "golden belly".
In 1989, morphological and genetic studies indicated trout of the Pacific Basin were genetically closer to Pacific salmon (Oncorhynchus species) than to the Salmos–brown trout (S. trutta) or Atlantic salmon (S. salar) of the Atlantic Basin.  Thus, in 1989, taxonomic authorities moved the rainbow, cutthroat and other Pacific Basin trout, including the Mexican native trout, into the genus Oncorhynchus.

In 1997, a group of approximately 40 ichthyologists, biologists and naturalists from several U.S. and Mexican institutions formed a collaborative group, Truchas Mexicanas, to study the diversity of Mexican native trout. Between 1997 and 2005, members of the group explored the rivers and streams of the Sierra Madre Occidental collecting specimens for study and documenting the diverse populations of Mexican native trout.  In 2002, fisheries biologist Robert J. Behnke published Trout and Salmon of North America, documenting a lifetime study of North American trout and salmon.  In Trout and Salmon of North America, Behnke described two species of trout—the Mexican golden trout (O. chrysogaster) and the Mexican rainbow trout (O. m. nelsoni and O. m. ssp). He described a number of local forms of the Mexican rainbow trout primarily based on the river systems they occurred in.

In 2015, a report delving into the genetics of Mexican golden trout and Mexican rainbow trout from various rivers was published. The authors, in discussing their findings, state:

The phylogeny of Mexican native trout is an unsettled science.  Some studies suggest that the trout are descendants of the coastal rainbow trout (O. m. irideus) based on the idea that in wetter times, rainbow trout (steelhead) could have easily gained access to Baja California and the Sierra Madre Occidental tributaries from the Pacific ocean. Others have suggested a connection to the inland Columbia River redband trout (O. m. gairdneri). Others have pointed to evidence in some populations that Mexican native trout may have descended from cutthroat trout (O. clarki).

Range
The endemic range of Mexican native trout extends from near the U.S.–Mexican border in western Chihuahua and eastern Sonora south through the Sierra Madre Occidental mountains of Durango. The southernmost recorded occurrence is in the headwaters of the Río Acaponeta in Durango. The first scientific collections of trout from Mexico were by Prof. Nathaniel Thomas Lupton in the early 1880s. During Edward W. Nelson's 1898 expedition, he observed trout in the Rio del Presidio basin near the town of El Salto, but did not collect any specimens. In 1946, Ralph G. Miller an American researching Mexican ichthyofauna near El Salto collected the earliest surviving specimens of the Rio del Presidio trout, which now reside in the Smithsonian Institution. As of 2002, according to ichthyologist Robert J. Behnke, the Rio del Presidio trout were the southernmost natural distribution of any member of the family Salmonidae. This range was extended by collections from the Ríos Baluarte and Acaponeta in 2004.

The many forms of Mexican native trout are typically described by the river systems they occur in.

Conservation
The Mexican golden trout (O. chrysogaster) is listed as vulnerable by the IUCN Red List of Threatened Species.  None of the rainbow trout subspecies, including Nelson's trout (O. m. nelsoni) are formally listed by any conservation organization. The World Wildlife Fund considers the Rio Conchos trout critically endangered. Truchas Mexicanas reported in 2006 that all the populations of Mexican trout face threats from habitat loss due to logging, mining and aquaculture impacts. The greatest threat to the continued existence of genetically pure Mexican native trout appears to be the widespread rainbow trout aquaculture in the river basins where they reside. Escaped hatchery trout or trout stocked in rivers to support angling can hybridize with native stocks, which can eventually lead to genomic extinction.

Notes

External links
 Dr. Dave Neely Podcast (Includes discussion of Mexican native trout)
 Biodiversity of Native Mexican Trout (Genus Oncorhynchus spp.) and The Impending Treat of Their Demise by The Exotic Rainbow Trout O. mykiss gairdneri

Further reading
 
 

 

Oncorhynchus
Endemic fish of Mexico
Trout, M
Fauna of the Baja California Peninsula
Natural history of Baja California
Natural history of Baja California Sur
Natural history of Sonora
Fauna of the Sierra Madre Occidental